Teratausta is a monotypic moth genus of the family Crambidae described by George Hampson in 1903. It contains only one species, Teratausta odontalis, described in the same article, which is found in Silhet, Bangladesh.

References

Natural History Museum Lepidoptera genus database

Acentropinae
Monotypic moth genera
Moths of Asia
Crambidae genera
Taxa named by George Hampson